Sadsburyville is an unincorporated area in Sadsbury Township in Chester County, Pennsylvania, United States. Sadsburyville is located at the intersection of U.S. Route 30 Business and Old Wilmington Road about 4 miles west of Coatesville and about 3 miles northeast of Parkesburg.

References

Unincorporated communities in Chester County, Pennsylvania
Unincorporated communities in Pennsylvania